Caulfield is an unincorporated community in western Howell County, Missouri, United States. It is located on U.S. Highway 160 and Missouri Route 101, approximately fifteen miles west of West Plains. The Ozark County line lies just to the west of Caulfield.

History
A post office called Caulfield has been in operation since 1929. The community takes its name from Missouri governor Henry Stewart Caulfield, who assumed office in 1929.

On March 1, 2007, a tornado hit Caulfield, killing seven-year-old Caulfield resident, Elizabeth Croney.

References

Unincorporated communities in Howell County, Missouri
Unincorporated communities in Missouri